The Lion Men: Ultimate Showdown is a Singapore action comedy film directed by Jack Neo and starring Tosh Zhang, Wang Weiliang, Eva Cheng and Chen Tianwen. The main plot revolves around two lion dance groups pitting themselves against each other.

Cast
 Tosh Zhang as Shishen/Supreme
 Wang Weiliang as Mikey
 Eva Cheng as Xiao Yu
 Chen Tianwen as Master He
 Noah Yap as Zhang Bu Da
 Charlie Goh as Ah Qiang
 Maxi Lim as Babyface

Plot
After the events from the first part, Lion Men 2 picks up after Mikey's superb performance. Shi Shen becomes jealous of Mikey, especially after he discovers Mikey's feelings for Xiao Yu. Determined to succeed, Shi Shen spends more time training, neglecting Xiao Yu. Situation worsens when Xiao Yu is kidnapped, forcing Shi Shen and Mikey to choose between the competition and their love for Xiao Yu. Who will step up to save her?

Production

Music
The official theme song of The Lion Men: Ultimate Showdown, titled "We Are Brothers" was composed by Jack Neo, Tosh Zhang and Bunz Bao.

Release
The Lion Men: Ultimate Showdown was released on 12 June 2014.

References

2014 films
Singaporean comedy films
Films directed by Jack Neo
Singaporean action films